Johann Ludwig Hannemann (25 October 1640 – 25 October 1724) was a professor of medicine who famously opposed the idea of the circulation of the blood. He studied the chemistry of phosphorus, gold, and hematite; wrote articles on metallurgy, botany, theology, and various medical topics. He was an adherent of the views of the ancients and pre-Renaissance alchemists. He trained his medical students according to the schools of Galen, Hippocrates, and Aristotle.

He first studied theology before studying medicine.  He is best known for disseminating the Curse of Ham calumny.

In 1675, he became a full professor at the University of Kiel.

He was the doctoral advisor of Georg Gottlob Richter.
In 1680, he became a member of Leopoldina.

Works

References

 Biographie Medicale; Bayle, G.-L.; Thillaye, J. B.-J., Eds.; B. M. Israel: 1967 Reprint; pp. 184–185.
 Jöcher's Allgemeine Gelehrten Lexicon; Johann Friedrich Gleditschen: 1750-1787; vol. 2, col 1352-1353.
 Biographisches Lexikon der hervorragenden Ärzte; Urban & Schwarzenberg: 1962; vol. 3, pp. 52–53.

External links
 Books by Hannemann

1640 births
1724 deaths
17th-century German physicians
18th-century German physicians
Academic staff of the University of Kiel
Physicians from Amsterdam